Ibrahima Kebe (born 1 August 2000) is a Malian professional footballer who plays as a central midfielder for Spanish club Girona FC.

Club career
Kebe joined Girona FC's youth setup in February 2019, from Danaya AC. He made his senior debut with the club's reserves in the regional leagues during the 2019–20 campaign, and was included in the first team's return after the COVID-19 pandemic in May 2020.

Kebe made his professional debut on 13 June 2020, coming on as a second-half substitute for Pape Maly Diamanka in a 0–0 Segunda División away draw against UD Las Palmas. On 31 August of the following year, he renewed his contract until 2024, being definitely promoted to the main squad.

Regularly used during the 2021–22 season as Girona achieved promotion to La Liga, Kebe suffered a knee injury in June 2022, being sidelined for six months.

References

External links
 Profile at the Girona FC website
 
 
 

2000 births
Living people
Sportspeople from Bamako
Malian footballers
Association football midfielders
Segunda División players
Divisiones Regionales de Fútbol players
Girona FC B players
Girona FC players
Malian expatriate footballers
Malian expatriate sportspeople in Spain
Expatriate footballers in Spain
21st-century Malian people